Byara is a town located in the Halabja Governorate of Kurdistan Region in Iraq. It is the main town of Byara District.  From 2001 to 2003, Byara was the center of the Islamic Emirate of Byara.

References

Halabja Governorate
Hawraman
Populated places in Halabja Governorate